

The Punta de Anaga Lighthouse is an active lighthouse on the Canary island of Tenerife, in the municipality of Santa Cruz de Tenerife. Punta de Anaga is the most northerly point on the island, and is where the Anaga mountain range meets the sea.

It was originally proposed to construct a second order lighthouse on the Savage Islands, which lie 165 km north of Tenerife. But the sovereignty of the islands was an issue, so a first order light was commissioned at Punta de Anaga instead.

History 
Completed in 1864, it is one of the oldest lighthouses in the Canaries; Punta de Jandía on Gran Canaria was also opened in the same year.

Built in a similar style to other Canarian 19th century lights, it consists of a white washed single storey house, with dark volcanic rock used for the masonry detailing.  A twelve metre high tower, with a twin gallery is attached to the seaward side of the house, facing the Atlantic Ocean.

The lighthouse still retains its original Fresnel lens, which was supplied by Barbier and Fenestre of Paris. The lighthouse is maintained by the port authority of the Province of Santa Cruz de Tenerife (Autoridad Portuaria de Santa Cruz de Tenerife), and is registered under the international Admiralty number D2820 and has the NGA identifier of 113–23852.

See also 

 List of lighthouses in Spain
 List of lighthouses in the Canary Islands

References

External links 
 Comisión de faros
 Autoridad Portuaria de Santa Cruz de Tenerife

Lighthouses in Tenerife
Lighthouses completed in 1864